Cadwaladerite is a rare aluminium halide mineral with formula: AlCl(OH)2·4(H2O). It was reported for an amorphous substance associated with sulfate minerals and embedded in a halite crystal cluster. Its status is uncertain due to inadequate data.
It was first described in 1941 for an occurrence in mine dumps of the Victoria Segunda mine Cerros Pintados, Iquique province, Tarapacá Region, Chile. It was named for Charles Meigs Biddle Cadwalader, president of the Academy of Natural Sciences. Lesukite was discredited (IMA2018-H).

References

Halide minerals
Aluminium minerals
Minerals described in 1941